"The Soldier's Song" is the Irish national anthem.

Soldier's Song may also refer to:

The Soldier's Song (novel), first in the Soldier's Song trilogy by Alan Monaghan, published in 2010
"A Soldier's Song", a poem by C. Flavell Hayward and set to music by Elgar as "A War Song" in 1884
"Soldier's Song", a Hungarian-language choral work by Zoltán Kodály (1882–1967)

See also
 Songs title "Soldier" or "Soldiers"; see 
 War song (disambiguation)